Abersychan is a town and community north of Pontypool in Torfaen, Wales, and lies within the boundaries of the historic county of Monmouthshire and the preserved county of Gwent.

Abersychan lies in the narrow northern section of the Afon Lwyd valley.

The town includes two schools; Abersychan Comprehensive School and Victoria Primary School; together with various shops and other amenities including Abersychan Rugby Club.

Abersychan was the birthplace of the politicians Roy Jenkins, Don Touhig and Paul Murphy (member of parliament for Torfaen); and of the rugby footballers Wilfred Hodder, Candy Evans and Bryn Meredith.

History

Like many of the 17th century isolated agricultural hamlets in the forested South Wales Valleys, Abersychan became a thriving industrial centre in the 19th and early 20th centuries, particularly for iron production.

After the discovery of iron stone locally, the principal ironworks were built by the British Iron Company in 1825, served mainly by the London and North Western Railway's Brynmawr and Blaenavon Railway. The ironwork's main office building and quadrangle were designed by architect Decimus Burton, best known for his design of London Zoo. The works passed to the New British Iron Company in 1843 and to the Ebbw Vale Company in 1852, before closing in 1889. On 6 February 1890, an underground explosion at Llanerch Colliery killed 176.

Abersychan Limestone Railway: built  to carry limestone from Cwm Lascarn quarry to the British Ironworks.
Air Furnace at British Ironworks
British Colliery Pumping Engine House: a Cornish beam pumping engine house built by the British Iron Company. Built of sandstone with a slate roof, and retains several fixtures
Cwmbyrgwm Colliery: Site of former colliery including remains of a water-balance headgear, chimney, oval shafts, water power dams, tramroad routes, and waste tips.

Various proposals have been made over the years to redevelop the site, currently under the ownership of HSBC, but none have so far passed the requirements of Torfaen county council.

Local government
Abersychan constitutes a community and electoral ward of the county borough of Torfaen. The area was part of the ancient parish of Trevethin, in Monmouthshire. On 3 June 1864 Abersychan was constituted a local government district, governed by a local board. In 1894 Abersychan became an urban district and civil parish. The urban district was abolished in 1935, with most of its area passing to Pontypool urban district, and a small area going to Abercarn UD.

In 1974 the area became part of the borough of Torfaen, in the new local government county of Gwent. The community of Abersychan was formed in 1985, but no community council has yet been formed. Abersychan and Cwmavon is now a ward for the Pontypool Community Council. In 1996 Torfaen became a unitary authority.

The Abersychan community includes Abersychan, Cwmavon, Garndiffaith, Pentwyn, Talywain, Varteg, and Victoria Village.

Local Transport 

The nearest railway stations to Abersychan are Pontypool & New Inn (3 miles), Llanhilleth (3.5 miles) and Abergavenny (7 miles). Abersychan was served by the following (disused) stations:
Abersychan and Talywain railway station
Abersychan Low Level railway station

Places nearby

Pentwyn 
Pentwyn, Torfaen is a small village located in the district of Abersychan. It contains a post office, several houses and a small play park. The village has a cricket team (Pontnewynydd CC) and is located right next to the old railway line. The cricket club celebrated its 100-year anniversary in 2006 with a successful tour to Cork, Ireland. The village has superb views over the River Severn and Newport to the south.

Victoria Village
Victoria Village is a small hamlet located in the district of Abersychan. It comprises a small village school and a number of houses. A small group of houses on Incline Road mark the beginning of the village and the village boundary is near Cwmavon. Victoria Primary School is also in this area, housed in large grounds. Many homes are built around the school's boundaries.
Victoria Village primary school was opened in 1903 and closed by the council in 2018. The last head of the school was Miss Joy Dando. And caretaker Miss Debbie Williams.

References

Towns in Torfaen
Local Government Districts created by the Local Government Act 1858
Communities in Torfaen
Electoral wards of Torfaen